Senator Falconer may refer to:

Jacob Falconer (1869–1928), Washington State Senate
Russell C. Falconer (1851–1936), Wisconsin State Senate